Miss Rwanda 2014, the fourth edition of the Miss Rwanda pageant, was held on February 22, 2014 at Petit Stade of Remera in the province of Kigali.

The winner, Colombe Akiwacu succeeded Aurore Mutesi Kayiranga, Miss Rwanda 2012. Colombe participated in Miss Supranational 2016 the third competition of beauty pageant all over the world, where she was ranked 17th among 75 countries. The first best ranking of Rwanda since its entry in this competition. Colombe is currently based in Paris where she is doing her career as a fashion model.

Results

Special Awards 
Miss Congeniality - Melissa Isimbi (Northern Province)
Miss Photogenic - Yvonne Mukayuhi (Eastern Province)
Miss Popular - Yvonne Mukayuhi (Eastern Province) 
Miss Heritage - Marlène Umutoniwase (Northern Province)

Contestants

Contestant notes 
Carmen Akineza, had finished in the top 5 of Miss Rwanda 2012.
Vanessa Mpogazi, participated in Miss Rwanda 2015 but she unplaced. Later, she had finished 2nd runner-up at Miss Rwanda 2016.

References

External links
Official website

2014
2014 in Rwanda
2014 beauty pageants